Makro is a Dutch international brand of warehouse clubs, also called cash and carry stores. Makro was founded by SHV Holdings, a Dutch conglomerate based in Utrecht in partnership with German company Metro AG, with the first warehouse club opened in Amsterdam in 1968. Currently, ownership of the worldwide chain of stores is split between different companies like Metro AG in Europe (except UK), SHV Holdings in Latin America (except Peru) and CP All in Asia. In many countries, access to stores is restricted to business customers, and the stores are not open to the general public.

History 
SHV originated in 1896 from a merger between a number of large coal mining companies, some of which had been active since the 18th century.

In 1968, the first Makro store opened in Amsterdam. In the following years more stores opened in the Netherlands and several other European countries.
In April 1971 the first Makro in the UK opened in Eccles, Manchester. Also in 1971, the first Makro store outside Europe opened in South Africa.

In the 1970s and 1980s Makro extended its business to the Americas and Asia. Makro had also expanded to the United States in the mid-1980s. In 1989, Kmart bought the US locations, and converted most of them to Pace Warehouse in 1990.

In 1988, the first Makro store in Asia opened in Thailand.

The South African stores were subsequently in 1990 exchanged for a shareholding in Massmart and in 2004 SHV sold its Massmart shares.

In 1998, owner SHV Holdings sold the Makro stores in Europe to German partner Metro AG. The sale, announced on 29 October 1997, was approved by the supervisory board of Metro AG on 17 December 1997.

Makro who opened first store in the Philippines in 1996 through a joint-venture with SM Prime Holdings and Ayala Group. In 2004 Ayala sold its 28% stake to its joint-venture partners. In late 2007 SM Investments folded the Makro stores into its operations after it increased its ownership of Pilipinas Makro to 60%. The SM group took 100% in Makro, and later rebranded all Makro stores to SM Hypermarkets and SM Savemore.

On 31 January 2007, Makro Malaysia was acquired by Tesco and the 8 stores in Malaysia were converted to Tesco Extra.

In 2010, Makro Cash & Carry Indonesia was sold to Lotte Mart and rebranded as Lotte Mart Wholesale.

In 2012, Metro sold the Makro UK business to Booker Group, while Makro-Habib in Pakistan was rebranded as Metro-Habib.

In 2013, SHV sold Siam Makro Pcl. (Thailand) to CP ALL, a subsidiary of CP Group.

In 2014, Metro sold the Makro Greek business to Sklavenitis and rebranded as The Mart in 2016.

In 2020, 30 of 54 Makro stores in Brazil, were acquired by Carrefour.

In December 2022, Makro Cash & Carry Belgium went bankrupt in Belgium. All 6 shops closed permanently

Store locations 
European stores can be found in the Netherlands, the Czech Republic, Slovakia, Poland, Portugal, Spain and the United Kingdom. Stores have spread as Colombia, South Africa, Argentina, Peru, Venezuela, Cambodia, Myanmar, Thailand.

Makro stores formerly existed in China, Greece, Belgium, Indonesia, Malaysia, Morocco, Pakistan, Philippines, South Korea, Taiwan and the United States.

Netherlands
Makro Netherlands operates 17 stores across the Netherlands, with seven of the stores also containing a fuel station. Makro Netherlands is owned by the Metro Group. Since January 2018, The Chief Executive Officer is Paulo Peerenboom.

Thailand
Siam Makro Public Company Limited was established in 1988. At the end of April 2020 there were 100 Makro stores and Makro FoodService stores in operation, serving a registered customer base of 2.6 million. Revenues for 2020 were 210 billion baht with a net profit of 6.2 billion baht. Siam Makro shares are traded on the Stock Exchange of Thailand (SET).

In 2013, Siam Makro was purchased by Charoen Pokphand Group for US$6.6 billion. Siam Makro is owned by CP ALL, a subsidiary of CP Group.

United Kingdom
Makro UK operates 30 branches across the United Kingdom. Since 2012 Makro UK has been owned by Booker Group, and 11 of the Makro branches now operate as a combined Booker/Makro.

Venezuela
SVH operates 35 Makro warehouse clubs across the country and also have a supermarket chain named Mikro with 19 stores.

Spain
 Makro España was founded in 1972
 Operates 37 stores in 15 different regions
 Had a total of 3700 employees (2021)
 2021 sales was €1097 million

Product range 

Makro sells food and non-food products, usually located in different sections of the store. Each store also contains a hot-food cafeteria, and a cash machine.

The food section always includes a fresh fish section, a wine section, fresh meat and butchery department, and refrigerated aisles.  The non-food area includes clothing, DIY, office supplies, electricals, computing, and seasonals such as garden furniture.

Special offers are featured via a printed and online fortnight brochure known as Makro Mail.

The stores are not open to the general public, but serve the following trades:

 Newsagent's shops and convenience stores.
 Restaurants, hotels and caterers.
 Schools, universities, sport clubs and associations.

Customers can shop at Makro with a membership card.

Makro UK used to have the tag-line "The UK's No.1 Discounter". This tag-line was replaced with "For Professionals". Makro has subsequently changed this to "Your business partner everyday" [sic].

Recent changes to the Makro UK structure include the closure of three stores: Wolverhampton, Coventry and Swansea. Metro announced that the company has to be financially independent by 2011, and in 2012 Makro UK was sold to the rival wholesaler Booker Group in an agreement valued at around £140 million.

References

Charoen Pokphand
1968 establishments in the Netherlands
Discount stores
Dutch brands